Job is known as a prophet in Islam and is mentioned in the Quran. Job's story in Islam is parallel to the Hebrew Bible's story, although the main emphasis is on Job remaining steadfast to God; there is no mention of Job's discussions with friends in the Qur'anic text, but later Muslim literature states that Job had brothers, who argued with the man about the cause of his affliction. Some Muslim commentators also spoke of Job as being the ancestor of the Romans. Islamic literature also comments on Job's time and place of prophetic ministry, saying that he came after Joseph in the prophetic series and that he preached to his own people rather than being sent to a specified community. Tradition further recounts that Job will be the leader in Heaven of the group of "those who patiently endured".

In the Quran
Ayūb (Job) is first mentioned in the Quran in the following verse: 

The Quran describes Job as a righteous servant of God, who was afflicted by suffering for a lengthy period of time. However, it clearly states that Job never lost faith in God and forever called to God in prayer, asking Him to remove his affliction:

The narrative goes on to state that after many years of suffering, God ordered Job to "Strike with thy foot!". At once, Job struck the ground with his foot and God caused a cool spring of water to gush forth from the Earth, from which Job could replenish himself. The Quran states that it was then that God removed his pain and suffering and He returned Job's family to him, blessed him with many generations of children and granted him great wealth. In addition to the brief descriptions of Job's narrative, the Quran further mentions Job twice in the lists of those whom God had given special guidance, wisdom and inspiration (4:163) and as one of the men who received authority, the gift of prophethood (6:84).

After Satan had given up trying to turn Job away from the Lord, God removed Job's affliction and returned his family to him, doubling them in number. He returned Job's wealth and showered Job with gold. Once Job's wife had seen her husband restored to prosperity and health, she prayed thanks to God but then worried over the oath her husband had taken earlier, in which he had promised to beat her with a hundred strokes. Job was also deeply grieved over the oath he had taken, amidst his suffering. God, however, sent a revelation to Job, which told him to not beat his wife but to gently hit her with a bundle of soft grass.

Qur'anic commentary and Muslim tradition
Ibn Kathir narrates the story in the following manner. Job was a very rich person with much land, and many animals and children — all of which were lost and soon he was struck with skin disease as a test from God.  He was afflicted with sores that crawled with worms.  He remained steadfast and patient, so God eventually relieved him of the disease.

Job's lineage was an important field of study for many of the early Islamic scholars. A prevalent belief among early commentators was that Job descended from the line of Esau, the son of Ishaq. Although various commentators gave different genealogies relating to Job, all of them traced his ancestry to Abraham through Isaac's son Esau. Those scholars who traced Job's lineage back to Abraham did so by using the following Qur'anic verse as the basis for their view:"That was the reasoning about Us which We gave to Abraham (to use) against his people. We raise whom We will in degree, for thy Lord is full of wisdom and knowledge. We bestowed upon him [Abraham] Isaac and Jacob, all (three) We guided; and before him We guided Noah and among his progeny David, Solomon, Job, Joseph, Moses, and Aaron. Thus do We reward those who do good."

Muslim historical literature fleshes out Job's story and describes him as being a late descendant of the patriarch Noah. Similar to the Hebrew Bible's narrative, Ibn Kathir mentions that Satan heard the angels of God speak of Job as being the most faithful man of his generation. Job, being a chosen prophet of God, would remain committed in daily prayer and would frequently call to God, thanking God for blessing him with abundant wealth and a large family. But Satan planned to turn the God-fearing Job away from God and wanted Job to fall into disbelief and corruption. Therefore, God allowed Satan to afflict Job with distress and intense illness and suffering, as God knew that Job would never turn away from his Lord. Although Job's possessions were destroyed and he suffered many calamities, he remained steadfast in his worship of God and remained committed to his religion. Satan then appeared to Job in the guise of an old man and suggested that God was not rewarding Job for his prayer. Job, however, rebuked Satan and told him that God is all-knowing and does what He thinks is best. It is said that then Satan, having failed at tempting Job, turned to Job's wife, who was also a faithful woman. Satan reminded Job's wife of her life before Job's affliction and how they were abundant in family and fortune. Job's wife, although she did not lose faith, burst into tears and asked Job to tell God to remove this suffering from the household. Job, in his misery, rebuked his wife and told her that this suffering had been for a relatively short period of time and, without thinking, told her that he would beat her with 100 strokes for complaining. After Job was cured, God ordered him to take some grass and to hit her 100 times. By doing this, Job fulfilled his promise to God but didn't hurt her. This Islamic narrative has now become symbolic and is often used by Islamic preachers as a reminder to be kind with wives. 

Philip K. Hitti asserted that the subject was an Arab and the setting was Northern Arabia.

Associated places

References

Bibliography

Qur'an references
 Job's prophecy: 4:163, 6:84
 Trial and patience: 21:83, 21:84, 38:41, 38:42, 38:43, 38:44

Further reading
 Ibn Kathir, Bidaya wa l-Nihaya, i, 220–225
 Tafsir on XXI and XXXVII
 Tabari, i, 361–364
 Thalabi, Tales of the Prophets, Cairo 1339, 106–114
 Kisa'i, Stories of the Prophets, 179–190
 Ibn Asakir, Tarikh al-Kabir, iii, 190–200

Job (biblical figure)
Prophets of the Quran
Hebrew Bible prophets of the Quran